The Frigate Island caecilian (Hypogeophis rostratus) is a species of amphibians in the family Indotyphlidae, endemic to Seychelles, where it is the most widespread caecilian species. It is found on all the islands with amphibians, namely Mahé, Praslin, Silhouette, Ste. Anne, Curieuse, La Digue, Cerf, and Frégate.

References

 

Indotyphlidae
Endemic fauna of Seychelles
Amphibians described in 1829
Taxa named by Georges Cuvier
Taxonomy articles created by Polbot